Hunterspoint Avenue is a station on the Main Line of the Long Island Rail Road within the City Terminal Zone. It is located at 49th Avenue (formerly Hunters Point Avenue) between 21st Street and Skillman Avenue in the Hunters Point and Long Island City neighborhoods of Queens, New York City. This ground-level station has an island platform between two tracks and is currently not wheelchair accessible from the entrance above the station.

The station is served only during weekday rush hours in the peak direction (to Hunterspoint Avenue from Long Island in the morning, from Hunterspoint Avenue to Long Island in the evening). Trains serving here usually run on the Oyster Bay, Montauk, or Port Jefferson Branches. Some westbound trains continue to and terminate at Long Island City, and some eastbound trains originate in Long Island City. All service is provided by diesel trains that cannot use the East River Tunnels, but the tracks are electrified.

History 
Hunterspoint Avenue station opened in August 1860, three years before the New York and Flushing Railroad built their own Hunter's Point station. LIRR's Hunterspoint Avenue was renovated in April 1878, but burned in a fire in December 1902. The station was replaced on April 26, 1903, only to be rebuilt again nine years later. [The preceding is confusing the Hunterspoint station (renamed Long Island City) with the Hunterspoint AVENUE station. They are two different stations.] According to a New York Times article from May 1914, the third station was scheduled to open on July 1, 1914. Instead, the reopening date was delayed until October 18, 1914. [The Times article actually makes it clear, this is a NEW station, located east of the original Hunterspoint station, which had long since been renamed Long Island City and still existed.]

In June 1947, only two weekday trains were scheduled east from Hunterspoint Ave, one to Jamaica and one to Queens Village. Trains destined beyond electrified territory could leave Penn Station behind DD1 electric locomotives and change engines at Jamaica; thirteen weekday trains did so. That service ended in 1951, leading to Hunterspoint Avenue's present role.

On November 22, 1948, a -long extension of the platform went into service.

In the 2010s, it was announced that the station would receive renovations and become compliant with the Americans with Disabilities Act of 1990, as part of the 2015-2019 MTA Capital Program. However, this was pushed back in an amendment from August 2017 until the MTA's 2020-2024 Capital Program.

Station layout
The station has one 10-car long high-level island platform between the two Main Line tracks, with stairways on both sides of 49th Avenue.

Gallery

References

External links 

 Hunterspoint Avenue entrance from Google Maps Street View
 Platform from Google Maps Street View
 Wooden Station Sign and covered entrance from the bridge in 1958; by W.J. Edwards (TrainsAreFun)

Long Island Rail Road stations in New York City
Railway stations in the United States opened in 1860
Railway stations in Queens, New York
Long Island City
1860 establishments in New York (state)